Home Is Where the Heart Is is an album by American musician David Grisman released in 1987. After the 1987 jazz album, Svingin' with Svend, this record contains more traditional bluegrass and includes such stars of the genre as Doc Watson, Tony Rice, J.D. Crowe and others.

Track listing
 "True Life Blues" (Bill Monroe) – 2:28
 "Down in the Willow Garden" (Traditional) – 4:30  
 "My Long Journey Home" (Monroe) – 2:25    
 "Little Willie" (Traditional) – 2:56    
 "Highway of Sorrow" (Monroe, Pyle) – 3:26
 "Sophronie" (Delmore. (Mullins) – 3:00    
 "My Aching Heart" (Sloan) – 2:19    
 "Close By Little Robert" (Monroe) – 2:32    
 "Feast Here Tonight" (Traditional) – 2:32   
 "Leavin' Home" (Traditional) – 4:07  
 "Little Cabin Home on the Hill" (Flatt, Monroe) – 3:22    
 "I'm Coming Back (But I Don't Know When)" (Monroe) – 3:25   
 "Salty Dog Blues" (Morris) – 2:26  
 "If I Lose" (Stanley) – 2:16  
 "Sad and Lonesome Day" (Traditional) – 3:05  
 "My Little Georgia Rose" (Monroe) – 3:04  
 "Foggy Mountain Top" (Carter Family) – 2:37  
 "I'm My Own Grandpaw" (Jaffe, Latham) – 3:11   
 "Pretty Polly" (Stanley) – 5:10    
 "Home Is Where the Heart Is" (Gately, Talley) – 1:57
 "Nine Pound Hammer" (Merle Travis) – 2:16
 "Memories of Mother and Dad" (Price) – 3:24  
 "Teardrops in My Eyes" (Allen, Sutton) – 2:57
 "House of Gold" (Williams) – 2:47

Personnel
David Grisman – mandolin, vocals
 Harley Allen – vocals
 Red Allen – guitar, vocals
 Jim Buchanan – violin
 Sam Bush – violin
 Porter Church – banjo
 Mike Compton – mandolin
 J.D. Crowe – banjo
 Stuart Duncan – violin
 Pat Enright – guitar, vocals
 Greg Fulginiti- mastering
 Mark Hembree – bass
 Bobby Hicks – violin
 Roy Huskey, Jr. – bass
 Jim Kerwin – bass
 Del McCoury – guitar, vocals
 Alan O'Bryant – banjo, vocals
 Herb Pedersen – banjo, vocals
 Tony Rice – guitar, vocals
 Curly Seckler – vocals
 Ricky Skaggs – violin, vocals
 Chris Austin - guitar, violin
 Doc Watson– guitar, vocals

References

1988 albums
David Grisman albums